Patrick Gleeson (born November 9, 1934) is an American musician, synthesizer pioneer, composer, and producer.

Career
Gleeson moved to San Francisco in the 1960s to teach in the English Department at San Francisco State. Gleeson began experimenting with electronic music in the mid-'60s at the San Francisco Tape Music Center using a Buchla synth and other devices. He resigned his teaching position to become a full-time musician. In 1968, "upon hearing Wendy Carlos' Switched-On Bach", he bought a Moog synthesizer and opened the Different Fur recording studio in San Francisco.

He worked with Herbie Hancock in the early 1970s on two albums (Crossings and Sextant) and subsequent tours, pioneering synthesizers as a live instrument. Hancock initially hired Gleeson as a synthesizer technician and instructor, but ended up asking him to become a full-time band member, expanding the ensemble from six to seven musicians. Hancock has credited Gleeson with introducing him to synthesizers and teaching him technique. Sextant and Headhunters were both recorded in part at Different Fur studios. Gleeson has subsequently worked with many other Jazz musicians, including Lenny White, Freddie Hubbard, Charles Earland, Eddie Henderson and Joe Henderson.

Gleeson recorded a number of solo albums, starting with Beyond the Sun - An Electronic Portrait of Holst's "The Planets" in 1976, to which Carlos contributed the sleeve notes. The album was nominated for a "best engineered recording-classical" Grammy in 1976. Beyond the Sun was followed in 1977 by a more commercial album, Patrick Gleeson's Star Wars.

He worked as a producer and engineer on the 1978 Devo album Q: Are We Not Men? A: We Are Devo!, part of which was recorded at Different Fur.
He sold his interest in Different Fur in 1985.

Gleeson has been involved in the scoring of a number of film soundtracks, including The Plague Dogs, Apocalypse Now, Crossroads and The Bedroom Window. He has scored nine television series, including Knots Landing.

In 2017 Gleeson retired from film and television scoring and returned to live performance, both as a solo artist and with a trio (Michael Shrieve, drums, and Sam Morrison, reeds).

Discography

As leader or co-leader
1976 - Beyond the Sun - An Electronic Portrait of Holst's "The Planets" (Mercury)
1977 - Patrick Gleeson's Star Wars (Mercury), reissued on
1980 - Rainbow Delta (Passport, reissued on Anthology, 2007)
 1982 - The Plague Dogs (Original Soundtrack) (CBS)
1982 - Patrick Gleeson's Computer Realization of Vivaldi's The Four Seasons(Varèse Sarabande)
1986 - Ewoks (1985-1987)
1998 - Driving While Black with Bennie Maupin (Intuition)
2007 - Slide, a chamber music album of jazz influenced minimalism
2008 - Jazz Criminal with Jim Lang and featuring Bennie Maupin and Wallace Roney
2019- Moogfest Live 2019

As sideman (partial listing)
With Paul Kantner, Grace Slick)
Sunfighter (RCA, 1971)
With Charles Earland
The Dynamite Brothers (Prestige, 1973)
Leaving This Planet (Prestige, 1973)
With Herbie Hancock
 Crossings (Warner Bros., 1971)
 Sextant (Columbia, 1972)
With Eddie Henderson
Realization (Capricorn, 1973)
Inside Out (Capricorn, 1974)
With Joe Henderson
Black Narcissus (Milestone, 1976)
With Meat Beat Manifesto
Actual Sounds + Voices (Nothing Records, 1998)
With Julian Priester
Love, Love (ECM, 1973)
With Lenny White
Venusian Summer (Nemperor, 1975)
Big City (Nemperor, 1977)
Presents the Adventures of the Astral Pirates (Elektra, 1978)

Further reading
 Danny Sofer and Doug Lynner, Interview with Patrick Gleeson, Synapse (magazine), Vol. 1, No. 5,  January/February 1977

References

External links

 Patrick Gleeson MySpace page
 Patrick Gleeson at discogs.com
 [ Patrick Gleeson] at AllMusic
 

American keyboardists
Living people
1934 births